Dollar Lake is a lake in Blaine County, Idaho, United States, located in the Smoky Mountains in Sawtooth National Forest. The lake is located along Warm Springs Creek along forest road 227 just south of Penny Lake and east of the town of Ketchum.

References

External links
Dollar Lake Idaho Department of Fish and Game

Lakes of Idaho
Lakes of Blaine County, Idaho
Sawtooth National Forest